Fu Yaning (born July 14, 1997), also known as Yenny, is a Chinese singer and actress under Gramarie Entertainment. She is known for her participation in the survival reality shows Girls Planet 999 and Youth With You 2.  On April 20, 2022, she released her debut extended play (EP), Ning.

Career

2020–present: Career beginnings and rising popularity
From March to May, Fu represented Gramarie Entertainment, alongside Zhang Luofei and Ge Xinyi on the girl group survival reality television show Youth With You 2. She was eliminated in Episode 16 and eventually placed 53rd. On June 20, Fu released the single "Navigator's Daughter". In October 15, she released another single titled "I'm Done" which was also co-written by her.

In March 2021, Fu sang the opening song of the Chinese drama Unusual Idol Love. From August to October, Fu participated in the Mnet survival show Girls Planet 999 as one of the program's 33 Chinese contestants. However, she  was eliminated during the finale, after ranking 12th overall with 560,606 votes. After the show, she released the track "Starlight". In December, Fu made her acting debut in a supporting role in the Chinese drama, My Heart. She also played the role of An Xiaoluo in the drama The Flowers are Blooming.

Fu released her debut extended play (EP), Ning on April 20, 2022.

Discography

Extended plays

Singles

Soundtrack appearances

Composition credits

Filmography

Television series

Television shows

Awards and nominations

References

External links

Living people
1997 births
Chinese idols
Actresses from Beijing
People from Beijing
Chinese Mandopop singers
Girls Planet 999 contestants
Youth With You contestants
Chinese television actresses
21st-century Chinese actresses
21st-century Chinese women singers